Trophies is a collaborative studio album by Detroit, Michigan producer Apollo Brown and D.I.T.C. member O.C. It was released by Mello Music Group in 2012.

Track listing

References

External links
 

2012 albums
Collaborative albums
O.C. (rapper) albums
Mello Music Group albums
Albums produced by Apollo Brown